A discography of albums released by the label NorCD. Distributor catalogue numbers are not provided here.

NorCD 

 Karl Seglem, Sogn-a-song (NORCD 9101, 1991)
 Isglem (Karl Seglem/Terje Isungset), Rom (NORCD 9102, 1991)
 Roald Wichmann a.o., Lieder + balladen (NORCD 9203, 1992)
 Isglem, To steg (NORCD 9204, 1992)
 Håkon Høgemo/Karl Seglem, Utla (NORCD 9205, 1992)
 Hot Cargo (Ole Thomsen a.o.), Hot cargo (NORCD 9206, 1992)
 Karl Seglem, Rit (NORCD 9410, 1994)
 Veslefrekk, Veslefrekk (NORCD 9411, 1994)
 Det Store Eventyret (Dag Øyvind Rebnord m.fl.), Det store eventyret (NORCD 9412, 1994)
 Jacob Young, This is you (NORCD 9513, 1995)
 Utla (Håkon Høgemo/Karl Seglem/Terje Isungset), Brodd (NORCD 9515, 1995)
 Isglem, Null G (NORCD 9615, 1996)
 Jon Fosse and Karl Seglem, Prosa (NORCD 9616, 1996)
 Close Erase (Christian Wallumrød/Per Oddvar Johansen/Ingebrigt Håker Flaten), Close erase (NORCD 9619, 1996)
 Berit Opheim, Eitt steg (NOR CD 9618, 1996)
 "Det Store Eventyret" (Dag Øyvind Rebnord o.a.), Scener fra den norske drømmen (NORCD 9707, 1997)
 Karl Seglem and Reidar Skår, Tya – fra bor til bytes (NORCD 9717, 1997)
 «SAN» (Andile Yenana/Bjørn Ove Solberg/Ingebrigt Håker Flaten/Paal Nilssen-Love/Zim Nggawana), Song (NORCD 9720, 1997)
 Lorentz Hop, Hardangerfiddle (NORCD 9721, 1997)
 Øystein B. Blix Band, På en lyserød sky (NORCD 9722, 1997)
 Elin Rosseland, Fra himmelen (NORCD 9723, 1997)
 Terje Isungset, Reise (NORCD 9724, 1997)
 Olav Dale Quartet, Little Waltz (NORCD 9725, 1997)
 TINGeLING, Tingeling (NORCD 9726, 1997)
 Utla, Juv (NORCD 9309, 1997)
 Lars Underdal, Gullfakse (NORCD 9827, 1998)
 Ivar Kolve Trio, Ope (NORCD 9828, 1998)
 Åse Teigland, Dansarsteinen (NORCD 9829, 1998)
 Karl Seglem, Spir (NORCD 9830, 1998)
 Thomas Winther Andersen, Line up (NORCD 9831, 1998)
 Peter Opsvik, Woodwork (NOR CD 9932, 1999)
 Øystein B. Blix Band, Texas (NORCD 9934, 1999)
 Utla, Dans (NORCD 9935, 1999)
 Close Erase (Christian Wallumrød/Per Oddvar Johansen/Ingebrigt Håker Flaten), No. 2 (NORCD 9933, 1999)
 Håkon Høgemo, Solo (NORCD 0036, 2000)
 Småkvedarane (samt Einar Mjølsnes/Gabriel Fliflet/Ivar Kolve), Syng (NORCD 0037, 2000)
 Tri'o Trang, Liker (NORCD 0038, 2000)
 Arve Henriksen/Karl Seglem/Terje Isungset), Daa (NORCD 0039, 2000)
 Synnøve S. Bjørset, Ram (NORCD 0140, 2001)
 AKKU (Elfi Sverdrup/Lars Andreas Haug/Ruth Vilhelmine Meyer), Akku (NORCD 0142, 2001)
 A.R.S. (Arne Braathen/Rolf Pifnitzka/Stephan Kersting/Ingvar Ambjørnsen), Ambjørnsen & Bo (NORCD 0141, 2001)
 Thomas Winther Andersen, Too much bass? (NORCD 0245, 2002)
 Karl Seglem, Nye nord (NORCD 0246, 2002)
 Terje Isungset, Middle of mist (NORCD 0348, 2003)
 Cissokho System, Kaíra (NORCD 0349, 2003)
 Isglem, Fire (NORCD 0343, 2003)
 Utla with Berit Opheim, Song (NORCD 0351, 2003)
 Elin Rosseland, Moment (NORCD 0450, 2004)
 Karl Seglem, New north (NORCD 0452, 2004)
 Thomas Winther Andersen, Out from a cool storage (NORCD 0454)
 Veslefrekk, Valse mysterioso (NORCD 0347, 2004)
 Karl Seglem Femstein (NORCD 0455, 2004)
 Håkon Høgemo, Lorentz Hop, Åse Teigland, Synnøve S. Bjørset, Hardanger fiddle (NORCD 0456, 2004)
 Karl Seglem, Budda og reven (NORCD 0501X, 2005)
 "Onkelfolke" (Audun Eken/Gro Kjelleberg Solli/Knut Egil Kristiansen/Tove Solheim/Øystein Sandbukt), Kasta beine (NORCD 0558, 2005)
 Sigrid Moldestad/Einar Mjølsnes/Håkon Høgemo, Gamaltnymalt (NORCD 0553, 2005)
 Tone Lise Moberg, Looking On (NORCD 0659, 2006)
 Kobert, Daniel Buner Formo/Erik Nylander/Ingrid Lode, Glowing (NORCD 0660, 2006)
 Jon Fosse and Karl Seglem, Dikt (NORCD 0557, 2005)
 Karl Seglem, Urbs (NORCD 0661, 2006)
 Jon Fosse, Prosa og dikt (NORCD 0662, 2006)
 Jørgen Orheim/Eivind Kaasin, Minimum bow force (NORCD 0663, 2006)
 Robert Rook trio, Hymn for fall, plays Thomas Winther Andersen (NORCD 0664, 2006)
 Berit Opheim and Sigbjørn Apeland, Den blide sol (NORCD 0765, 2007)
 Eple Trio, Made this (NORCD 0766, 2007)
 Olav Dale, Dabrhahi (NORCD 0767, 2007)
 Sturla Eide, Murru (NORCD 0768, 2007)
 Elin Rosseland, Trio (NORCD 0770, 2007)
 Slagr (Amund Sjølie Sveen, Anne Hytta and Sigrun Eng), Solaris (NORCD 0771, 2007)
 BOL, Skylab (NORCD 0772, 2007)
 Norchestra, Norchestra (NORCD 0873, 2008)
 Gabriel Fliflet, Rio Aga (NORCD 0874, 2008)
 Rolf Stensland and Rolf Sagen, Filleflabben syng (NORCD 0769, 2008)
 Per Jørgensen and Terje Isungset, Agbalagba daada (NORCD 0875, 2008)
 Eple Trio, The widening sphere of influence (NORCD 0876, 2008)
 Åse Teigland, Stille (NORCD 0877, 2008)
 Berit Opheim Versto and Karl Seglem, Draumkvedet (NORCD 0978, 2009)
 Arve Henriksen and Elling Vanberg, Ellivan (NORCD 0979, 2009)
 Tromsø Kunstforsyning (Bernt Simen Lund and Øystein B. Blix), Tur (NORCD 0980, 2009)
 Glima (Helene Waage, Ragnhild Knudsen and Torunn Raftevold Rue), Tåran (NORCD 0981, 2009)
 Karl Seglem, Norskjazz.no (NORCD 0982, 2009)
 Jon Eberson trio, Born to be slow (NORCD 0983, 2009)
 Lena Skjerdal trio, Home (NORCD 0984, 2009)
 Sigbjørn Apeland, Øyvind Skarbø and Nils Økland 1982 (NORCD 0985, 2009)
 Line Horneland, Horneland (NORCD 0986, 2009)
 Diverse, Folkelarm 2009 (NORCD 0987, 2009)
 Karl Seglem, Skoddeheimen (NORCD 0988, 2009)
 Kenneth Sivertsen, Spør vinden (NORCD 0990, 2009)
 Karl Seglem, Ossicles (NORCD 10100, 2010)
 Sturla Eide, Thriller (NORCD 1089, 2010)
 Eplemøya Songlag, Eplemøya songlag (NORCD 1091, 2010)
 Amherst (Ingvild Koksvik Amundsen, Lene Anett Killingmo, Ellen Andrea Wang, Lars Jakob Rudjord), A light exists in spring (NORCD 1092, 2010)
 Diverse artister, Førdefestivalen (NORCD 1093, 2010)
 Daniel Herskedal, City Stories (NORCD 1094, 2010)
 Blixband), Pinseria (NORCD 1095, 2010)
 Winther-Storm (Håkon Storm, Thomas Winther Andersen, Mark Coehoorn and Natalio Sued), Patchwork (NORCD 1096, 2010)
 BMX (Njål Ølnes, Thomas T. Dahl and Øyvind Skarbø with Per Jørgensen), Bergen Open (NORCD 1097, 2010)
 Ingvild K. Amundsen and Lars Jakob Rudjord, Orvilsk! (NORCD 1098, 2010)
 Eple Trio, In the clearing / In the Cavern (NORCD 1099, 2010)
 Gabriel Fliflet, Åresong (NORCD 1102, 2011)
 Blink, Blink (NORCD 1103, 2011)
 Akkus, Akkus (NORCD 1104, 2011)
 Håkon Storm, Zinober (NORCD 1105, 2012)
 Stein Versto, Urjen, slåtter etter Olav Groven and Eivind Groven (NORCD 1106, 2012)
 Lindha Kallerdahl, Let's Dance (NORCD 1107, 2012)
 Stian Omenås, Klangkammer 1 (NORCD 1201, 2012)
 Per Arne Ferner and Per Gunnar Juliusson, Undertowed (NORCD 1208, 2012)
 Kosmonavt (Inge W. Breistein, Audun Reithaug, Brage Tørmænen and Aron Nørstebø), Vår bakgård (NORCD 1209, 2012)
 Andrea Kvintett, Andrea Kvintett (NORCD 1210, 2012)
 Hullyboo (Marius Hirth Klovning, Bjørnar Kaldefoss Tveite and Mats Mæland Jensen), Bønner og flesk (NORCD 1211, 2012)
 Dag-Filip Roaldsnes, Først (NORCD 1212, 2012)
 Hammer & Hersk (Arild Hammerø  and Daniel Herskedal), Flåte (NORCD 1213, 2012)
 Eplemøya Songlag, Møya og myten (NORCD 1214, 2012)
 Summers: Silvola: Kvam, Mala Fama (NORCD 1215, 2012)
 Winther-Storm (Håkon Storm, Thomas Winther Andersen, Mark Coehoorn and Natalio Sued), Spinnaker (NORCD 1217, 2012)
 Cirrus, Méli Mélo, a Norwegian chamber jazz trio including Eva Bjerga Haugen, Inge W. Breistein & Theodore B. Onarheim (NORCD 1318, 2013)
 Gisle Torvik, Tranquil Fjord (NORCD 1320, 2013)
 Karl Seglem, NyeSongar.no (NORCD 1322, 2013)
 Duplex, Duolia (NORCD 1324, 2013)
 Duplex, Sketches of… (NORCD 1325, 2013)
 Daniel Herskedal, Dagane (NORCD 1326, 2013)
 Hanne Kalleberg's Papirfly, Papirfly (NORCD 1327, 2013)
 Andrea Kvintett, Russian Dream (NORCD 1328, 2013)
 Erik Halvorsen, Undergrunnane (NORCD 1431, 2014)
 Østerdalsmusikk, Østerdalsmusikk (NOR CD 1432, 2015)
 Baker Hansen, Chet på norsk / Ei som deg (NORCD 1436, 2014)
 Elin Rosseland, Vokal (NORCD 1437, 2014)
 Elin Rosseland, Vokal (NORCD 1438 LP, 2014)
 Andreas Haddeland, Tilhørighet (NORCD 1439, 2014)
 Kristoffer Eikrem & Kjetil Jerve, Feeling // Emotion (NORCD 1442, 2014)
 Kristoffer Eikrem & Kjetil Jerve, Feeling // Emotion (NORCD 1443 LP, 2014)
 Karl Seglem, Som Spor (NORCD 1445, 2014)
 Karl Seglem, Som Spor (NORCD 1446 LP, 2014)
 Parallax, Den tredje dagen (NORCD LP 1448, 2014)
 Holum trio, Heim (NORCD 1551, 2015)
 Karl Seglem & Christoph Stiefel Group, Waves (NORCD 1553, 2015)
 BenReddik, Gjemsel (NORCD 1554, 2015)
 Duplex (Harald Lassen & Christian Meaas Svendsen), Èn (NORCD 1556, 2015)
 Karl Seglem, Music From The Film «Struggle For Life» (NORCD 2000, 1998)

References

External links 
 

Discographies of Norwegian record labels